Glacier Peak High School is a high school in Snohomish, Washington, United States, operated by the Snohomish School District. Glacier Peak was opened in 2008 to relieve overcrowding at Snohomish High School; the  facility designed by NAC Architecture and built by Lydig Construction.

The site is adjacent to the former Cathcart Landfill, which opened in 1980 and closed in 1992 after reaching capacity. The high school was built on supplemental land that had been reserved for a future expansion but was later sold to the Snohomish School District.

The school opened in an almost completed state on September 3, 2008, for grades 9–11. It was completely finished by January 2009. Grades 9-12 have attended GPHS since September 2009, and the first senior class graduated on June 17, 2010.

GPHS has a large arts department; students can choose from performing and fine arts classes. A performing arts center provides a venue for GPHS's performances, including plays and musicals as well as jazz band, concert band, and choir concerts.

Alumni

Amy-Eloise Markovc, long-distance runner

References

External links
 Glacier Peak High School

High schools in Snohomish County, Washington
Public high schools in Washington (state)